"L'angelo azzurro" is a 1977 song composed by Umberto Balsamo (music) and  Cristiano Malgioglio (lyrics) and performed by Umberto Balsamo. This is Balsamo's biggest hit, topping the Italian hit parade, selling over a million copies.

The song has been described as "a sweet and smooth melody consisting of descendant sequences, almost magical in its evocative strength".

Track listing

 7" single – Polydor 060 141
 "L'angelo azzurro"  (Umberto Balsamo, Cristiano Malgioglio)
 "Malgrado tutto" (Umberto Balsamo, Cristiano Malgioglio)

Charts

References

1977 singles
Italian songs
1977 songs
Number-one singles in Italy
Songs written by Cristiano Malgioglio